Frans van Balkom (23 October 1939 - 2 September 2015) was a Dutch footballer and manager.

Career

Playing career

As a player, van Balkom signed for Australian side Ringwood City.

Managerial career

In 1973, he was appointed manager of Japanese side Tokyo Verdy. In 1976, van Balkom was appointed manager of Hong Kong. In 1980, he was appointed manager of Hong Kong. After that, he was appointed director of St. Louis Scott Gallagher in the United States. In 1995, van Balkom was appointed manager of Japanese club Albirex Niigata.

References

1939 births
2015 deaths
Albirex Niigata managers
Dutch expatriate footballers
Dutch expatriate sportspeople in Australia
Dutch expatriate sportspeople in Hong Kong
Dutch expatriate sportspeople in Indonesia
Dutch expatriate sportspeople in Japan
Dutch expatriate sportspeople in the United States
Dutch football managers
Dutch footballers
Expatriate football managers in Hong Kong
Expatriate football managers in Indonesia
Expatriate football managers in Japan
Expatriate soccer managers in the United States
Expatriate soccer players in Australia
Hong Kong national football team managers
Indonesia national football team managers
Ringwood City SC players
Tokyo Verdy managers
Sportspeople from Kerkrade
People from Schin op Geul
Footballers from Limburg (Netherlands)